St. Peter's Catholic Church is a historic church building at 935 Main Street in Worcester, Massachusetts.  Built-in 1884, the church is one of the city's finest and most ornate examples of Gothic Revival architecture.  It was listed on the National Register of Historic Places in 1980.  It is home to an active parish in the Roman Catholic Diocese of Worcester.

Architecture and history
St. Peter's is located on the south side of Main Street in southwestern Worcester, directly opposite the main Clark University campus.  It is a red brick structure with granite trim and ornate Gothic Revival styling.  It is basically rectangular, with a square tower projecting from the right front corner and a central projecting section on the main facade.  The tower has two narrow round-arch windows in the first three stages, this in the third (belfry) stage taller.  It is topped with ornate crenellations and spires.  The main facade has three entrances, one in the projecting section, and one each on either side.  The central entrance, set in a round-arch opening, is under a gable-roofed projection, with a row of round-arch windows set pairwise in round-arch recesses.  The flanking entrances are also set in round-arch openings, with circular rose windows on the second level.

St. Peter's Parish was established in 1884 to provide services to the burgeoning population of southwestern Worcester.  Ground for the church was broken on its construction that year, but it was not completed until 1893, the year in which it was formally dedicated.  It was designed by architect Patrick W. Ford.

See also
National Register of Historic Places listings in southwestern Worcester, Massachusetts
National Register of Historic Places listings in Worcester County, Massachusetts

References

External links

Churches on the National Register of Historic Places in Massachusetts
Gothic Revival church buildings in Massachusetts
Roman Catholic churches completed in 1884
19th-century Roman Catholic church buildings in the United States
Roman Catholic churches in Worcester, Massachusetts
National Register of Historic Places in Worcester, Massachusetts